Steve Robinson (born 13 December 1968, in Cardiff) is a retired Welsh former world boxing champion. He is best known for working in Debenhams as a storeman in Cardiff, then with just two days' notice, he accepted the fight against John Davison in 1993 for the vacant WBO Featherweight title and won the contest on a points decision. 

He was trained by the late boxing coach, Ronnie Rush.

Professional career

On 17 April 1993 the defending Featherweight Champion, Ruben Palacios from Colombia, was due to defend his title in Washington, England against John Davison from England. However, the champion failed a HIV test by the BBBC prior to the bout and was immediately stripped of his title by the WBO.  With only two days to go before the bout, the promoters had to find another opponent to face Davison.  Steve Robinson accepted the chance to fight for the WBO crown.  Robinson won the bout by a points decision against all the odds.  He was the new WBO World Featherweight Champion.  He was a worthy champion with 7 successful defences of his title.
 
On 30 September 1995 he defended his title for the last time, against Prince Naseem Hamed from Sheffield, England.  Hamed dominated the fight and Steve Robinson was knocked out in the eighth round.

He challenged for the European featherweight title on 3 February 1997, against the holder Billy Hardy, but was beaten on points.

He challenged for the European title, against John Jo Irwin on 4 December 1999 and won the bout on a points decision, and became the new European Boxing Union Featherweight Champion.  However, 6 months later on 23 June 2000, he lost his title to István Kovács from Hungary.

He challenged for the European featherweight title again on 25 May 2001, but ended in defeat over 12 rounds against Manuel Calvo from Spain.

Further defeats followed and Steve Robinson had decided to retire after his sixth loss in a row. He made his announcement after his points defeat to Steve Conway on 27 April 2002. He said after the bout, "I don't want to end it this way but there you are – it's happened.  I've seen the great heights and I've some fantastic memories but I've beaten better men than Steve Conway and I just think it's time to call it a day."

In retirement
On 1 February 2006, Robinson started Train Station 2, a "White Collar Boxing" fitness centre in Cardiff. He now runs Steve Robinson's Boxing Gym in his home town of Cardiff where he hopes to train a world champion.

In September 2020, Robinson announced that he had joined the Welsh National Party.

See also 

 List of Welsh boxing world champions

References

External links
 Steve Robinson on www.johnnyowen.com
 Steve Robinson's boxing record

 

1968 births
Living people
Welsh male boxers
Featherweight boxers
World featherweight boxing champions
World Boxing Organization champions
Boxers from Cardiff